The New Mexico hotspring snail (Pyrgulopsis thermalis) is a species of minute freshwater snail with an operculum, an aquatic gastropod mollusc or micromollusc in the family Hydrobiidae.

This species is endemic to the United States.  Its natural habitat is hot springs. It is threatened by habitat loss.

References

Molluscs of the United States
Pyrgulopsis
Gastropods described in 1987
Taxonomy articles created by Polbot